Ourense (in Spanish, Orense) is a Spanish province, in the southeastern part of the autonomous community of Galicia. It is bordered by the provinces of Pontevedra to the west, Lugo to the north, León and Zamora, (which both belong to Castile and León) to the east, and by Portugal to the south. With an area of 7,278 square km., it is the only landlocked province in Galicia. The provincial capital, Ourense, is the largest population centre, with the rest of the province being predominantly rural.

Denomination
Ourense (in Galician) is the official name adopted by Parliament in Spain, according to Law 2/1998.

Geography
Ourense is surrounded by mountains on all sides. These mountains historically isolated the province from the more populated Galician coast. Until a highway was built in recent years linking Ourense with Vigo in the west and Benavente in the east, the only quick way for people to enter or leave the province was by railway.

The principal river system is the Miño-Sil, the fertile valleys of which produce corn (maize) and grapes for wine. Due to the many rapids these rivers are not navigable, but they have been harnessed for hydroelectric power. The Sil flows through a deep canyon and has become a sought-after tourist site for its river cruises and views.

The Limia River begins north of Xinzo de Limia and flows south towards Portugal; the Lindoso reservoir is on this river as it crosses the border into Portugal. The Tâmega River, another important Portuguese river begins north of Verín. 

The mountainous terrain and isolation have kept the province economically challenged and encouraged much emigration to the rest of Spain and to the New World.  There is some wine production along the Miño valley and near Verín. There is also considerable pig breeding and potato growing, especially around the area of Xinzo da Limia, in the drained lakebed of Antela, which until the 1960s was the largest fresh-water lake in Spain.

Protected areas
The province has several protected areas and some natural parks, including:
Baixa Limia-Serra do Xures, near the border with Portugal
Natural Park da Serra de Enciña da Lastra
O Invernadeiro

Demography
Of the province's population of 309,986 (2018), about 30 per cent in the capital, Ourense, with 105,000 inhabitants. There are 92 municipalities in Ourense. Other than the capital the most important are O Barco de Valdeorras, Verín, Ribadavia, Allariz, A Rua, O Carballiño, Viana do Bolo, and Xinzo de Limia. As of 2018, Ourense has the lowest birthrate of any Spanish province, posting a population growth rate of -2,993.

Population development
The historical population is given in the following chart:

Economy
Industries include chemical manufacture, milk production, water bottling near Verín, and clothing manufacture near the capital city of Ourense. One of the largest poultry processing companies is also located in the industrial zone near that city.

The province has also four wine regions, out of five in the whole region of Galicia. Ribeiro, Ribeira Sacra, Monterrei and Valdeorras.

Although not a major tourist center, tourism contributes somewhat to the economy. The river valleys attract holidaymakers, and there are several preserved medieval towns (Allariz and Ribadavia).

See also
 List of municipalities in Ourense
 Monterrei (DO)
 Galician wine
 Hot springs Ourense

References

External links 

Tourist info
Photographs of Ourense